is a station located on the Tokyu Oimachi Line in a residential neighborhood of Meguro in southwest Tokyo, Japan.

Station layout
Two elevated side platforms.

History
On December 25, 1929, the station opened as Nakamaruyama Station.
On April 1, 1933, the station name was changed into Midorigaoka Station (緑ヶ丘駅).
On January 20, 1966, the station name in Japanese script was changed into the present name. Romanized name did not change.

Bus service
 bus stop
Tokyu Bus
<渋33>Shibuya Sta. - Toritsudaigaku Sta. - Midorigaoka Sta. - Yukigaya - Tamagawa Sta.
<多摩01>Tamagawa Sta. - Yukigaya - Midorigaoka Sta. - Toritsudaigaku Sta. - Tokyo Medical Center

References

Railway stations in Tokyo
Railway stations in Japan opened in 1929
Tokyu Oimachi Line
Stations of Tokyu Corporation